The Hindu Senior Secondary School is a school in Triplicane, Chennai, Tamil Nadu, India.

History
The school started by Hindu Educational Organisation in 1971 with a strength of 171. It has risen to be a senior secondary school and junior college with a strength of more than 2,500 students with classes from lower kindergarten to +2.

The Managing Committee of the Hindu High School started the Hindu Higher Secondary School for Boys (the Present Hindu Senior Secondary School and Junior College) in 1971 with Classes VI and VII.

The institution provides for the learning of four languages - Tamil (the regional language), Hindi (the official language), English (the international language) and Sanskrit (Indian classical language).

The Primary Section with Classes IV and V was opened in 1973. In 1974 classes I to III were opened and the school was converted into a co-educational institution. In June 1975, the Primary Department was a full-fledged institution with the addition of LKG and UKG and the Classes VI to XI (the then Higher Secondary) was affiliated to the Central Board of Secondary Education.

The school, which was accommodated in the HEO Hostel building at the beginning, has been shifted to the new building from June 1974 at 83 Big Street.

The 10+2+3 pattern of education was introduced in 1976-77 with the first batch for X Std, and the last year for XI std. (Higher Secondary).

The present Principal of the school is Shri. J. Srinivasa Raghavan.

Features of school 
All the three languages (English, Hindi, Tamil/Sanskrit) are taught at the same level, thus giving an opportunity for students to have equal proficiency in these languages. They can also learn music and dance.

School facilities include internet, computers and LCD projector. Students can join NCC(National Cadet Corps), JRC(Junior Red Cross), Scouts and Guides, Cubs and Bulbuls,  and Karuna Club.

Yoga from Classes IX to XII and simple physical exercise for the lower classes is compulsory.

Students are given various opportunities to participate in competitions conducted by reputed organisations. The school has a highly educated faculty. Teachers handling the classes IX-XII have completed the master's degree in the particular field

Primary schools in Tamil Nadu
High schools and secondary schools in Chennai
Educational institutions established in 1971
1971 establishments in Tamil Nadu